Carlos Calvo Sobrado (born 18 September 1985) is a Spanish former professional footballer who played mainly as a winger but also as a forward.

Club career
Calvo was born in Madrid. After playing well into his 20s with modest sides – Elche CF Ilicitano, Real Valladolid B, Villajoyosa CF and CD Alcoyano – he had his first taste of professional football in the 2007–08 season, with Segunda División's Xerez CD. On 13 June 2009, he became an integral part of the Andalusians' history as he scored the 2–1 winner against SD Huesca which certified the club's first-ever promotion to La Liga.

On 31 January 2010, as Xerez ranked last in the league, Calvo netted twice to help his team come from behind against RCD Mallorca at home, in just the second win in 20 games. After the team's relegation he moved to Serie A side Udinese Calcio for three years; on 13 July, however, he was transferred to Granada CF of the Spanish second level.

Calvo started in 15 of the league matches he appeared in his only season and scored three times, as the club achieved a second consecutive promotion. Still owned by the Italians, he spent the following campaign also in division two, with Hércules CF.

After his contract with Udinese expired, Calvo joined UD Almería on 31 August 2012. He spent the following years in the Super League Greece, with Skoda Xanthi FC.

On 25 August 2015, Calvo returned to Spain after agreeing to a one-year deal with SD Huesca, newly promoted to the second tier. After representing in quick succession Cádiz CF, CF Badalona and Recreativo de Huelva, he signed with Indian Super League franchise Jamshedpur FC on 10 August 2018.

In August 2020, after a very brief spell in Malta with Sliema Wanderers FC, the 35-year-old Calvo returned to Xerez, now in Tercera División.

References

External links

1985 births
Living people
Footballers from Madrid
Spanish footballers
Association football wingers
La Liga players
Segunda División players
Segunda División B players
Tercera División players
Elche CF Ilicitano footballers
Real Valladolid Promesas players
Villajoyosa CF footballers
CD Alcoyano footballers
Xerez CD footballers
Granada CF footballers
Hércules CF players
UD Almería players
SD Huesca footballers
Cádiz CF players
CF Badalona players
Recreativo de Huelva players
Udinese Calcio players
Super League Greece players
Xanthi F.C. players
Indian Super League players
Jamshedpur FC players
Maltese Premier League players
Sliema Wanderers F.C. players
Spanish expatriate footballers
Expatriate footballers in Greece
Expatriate footballers in India
Expatriate footballers in Malta
Spanish expatriate sportspeople in Greece
Spanish expatriate sportspeople in India
Spanish expatriate sportspeople in Malta